The Prisons and Probation Ombudsman (PPO) is a public body, in England and Wales, appointed by the Secretary of State for Justice to investigate complaints from prisoners, those subject to probation supervision, young people in detention (prisons and secure training centres) and immigration detainees. The organisation is also responsible for investigating all deaths of prisoners, young people in detention, approved premises’ residents and immigration detainees due to any cause, including any apparent suicides and natural causes. The PPO also investigates deaths of recently released prisoners or detainees, using their discretionary powers. Originally the PPO had no jurisdiction over the investigation of deaths in prisons or probation hostels.

History 
The PPO was established as the Prisons Ombudsman in 1994 following a report into the 1990 Strangeways Prison riot.

The Prisons and Probation Ombudsman's independence was challenged in 2000 by Mary Seneviratne who stated, "the Prisons Ombudsman does not meet the criteria of independence, because he [sic.] is appointed by and accountable to the Home Secretary." Although the PPO is no longer appointed by the Home Secretary, they are still appointed by a Secretary of State, who is a member of HM Government.

Jurisdiction and powers 
The Prisons and Probation Ombudsman (PPO) is a public body, in England and Wales, appointed by the Secretary of State for Justice to investigate complaints from prisoners, those subject to probation supervision, young people in detention (prisons and secure training centres) and immigration detainees. The organisation is also responsible for investigating all deaths of prisoners, young people in detention, approved premises’ residents and immigration detainees due to any cause, including any apparent suicides and natural causes. The PPO also investigates deaths of recently released prisoners or detainees, using their discretionary powers.

Originally the PPO had no jurisdiction over the investigation of deaths in prisons or probation hostels. The PPO employs a number of Investigators who are responsible for investigating the complaints made, making decisions on individual cases, and making any relevant recommendations.

Prisons and Probation Ombudsman 
As of October 2018, the Prisons and Probation Ombudsman is Sue McAllister CB; who replaced Acting Ombudsman, Elizabeth Moody. Elizabeth replaced Nigel Newman was originally appointed in June 2011, and his tenure was extended several times. The PPO is paid an annual salary of £100,000.

References

External links
Official website

Ombudsmen in England
Ombudsmen in Wales